Balam (Hindi: बालम, Beloved) is a 1949 Hindi romantic action film directed by Homi Wadia. Credited as A Hila Wadia Production by Wadia Brothers the film starred Suraiya, Wasti, Masood,  Nigar Sultana, Jayant, Gulnar and Agha. The music directors were Husnlal Bhagatram.

Cast
 Suraiya
 Wasti
 Masood
 Nigar
 Jayant
 Agha
 Jankidas
 Suraiya Chawdhry
 Gulnar
 Anwari
 Master Ratan
 H. Prakash

Music
The music was composed by Husnlal Bhagatram and lyrics by Qamar Jalalabadi. Lata Mangeshkar sang her first duet with Suraiya in this film with the song "O Pardesi Musafir Kise Karta Hai Ishare".

Song List

References

External links

1949 films
1940s Hindi-language films
Indian black-and-white films
Films directed by Homi Wadia